Claudine or Claudia ( – 19 November 1515) was Lady regnant of Monaco between 1457 and 1458, and the Lady consort of Monaco by marriage to Lord Lambert of Monaco.

Life

Claudine was the daughter of Blanche del Carretto and Catalan Grimaldi.  She was the only child of her father, and thereby his heir.

The succession of Monaco was regulated by her paternal grandfather Jean I, who allowed for female succession provided that a female heir kept her own name Grimaldi after marriage and passed it on to her children, and that her husband should take the name and arms of his wife.   Claudine's position as heir to the throne of Monaco was further secured by her father.

In his will, he stated that he was to be succeeded by his daughter Claudine who (to adjust to the will of his father that a female ruler was not to result in a change in dynasty), was to marry her cousin Lamberto Grimaldi di Antibes, to ensure that the Grimaldi family should keep the throne of Monaco and avoid a change in dynasty.    He further appointed his mother Pomellina Fregoso regent of Monaco until his daughter's majority and, in the event of Pomellina's death, that his brother-in-law Pierre Fregoso should succeed her as Claudine's regent until her majority.

Lady regnant of Monaco

In July 1457, Catalan died when Claudine was at the age of six, and her paternal grandmother Pomellina Fregoso duly became regent of Monaco in accordance with the written will of her son.   However, Claudine's fiancé Lambert opposed the will and demanded part of the regency, and his demand was supported by the population.   On 20 October therefore, Pomellina saw herself forced to sign a statement in which she was to share the power of regency with Lambert.  Pomellina then prepared to have Lambert ousted and killed in a coup in collaboration with Pierre Fregoso and Pierre Grimaldi, Lord of Beuil, the latter of whom she promised to make the father-in-law of Claudine.

In March 1458, the plot was staged, but Lambert managed to escape: with the support of the population of Menton and Roquebrune, he deposed Pomellina's regency government, confined her to her house in Menton, and had himself declared sovereign Lord as well as the regent and possessor of the rights of Claudine.

Lady consort of Monaco

The rights of Claudine were rather blurred.  Lambert regarded himself as having conquered the throne of Monaco and he had legally taken possession of Claudine's rights with public approval, and Claudine was thus no longer regarded as ruler in her own right but was essentially deposed.   The dynastic marriage between Claudine and Lambert was regardless to take place, but was postponed because of the young age of the bride.

On January 1460, a plot staged by Pomellina, Pierre de Beuil and the count de Tende (again with Claudine and her dynastic rights in the center) resulted in an attack on Monaco and Lambert's rule, which failed.

The marriage between Claudine and Lambert took place on 29 August 1465 in Vintimille.  The marriage between Claudine and Lambert has traditionally been described as a happy one.  There is not much information about whether she ever participated in politics during her tenure as lady consort.  In 1483, however, Lambert saw it necessary to obtain the consent of Claudine  to govern and regulate the will of succession after his death. This was in effect her renunciation of her rights and her consent to Lambert's use of them.  Nevertheless, Lambert did include her name when he proclaimed his sovereignty over the rebellious province of Mentone, which was not completely subdued until 1491.

Later life
Upon Lambert's death in 1494, their son Jean became Lord of Monaco as Jean II.  Claudine outlived Jean, who was murdered in 1505 by his brother Lucien, the subsequent lord.  According to tradition, Claudine was present during the murder of her son by her other son.  She is said to have mourned Jean openly after his death, thereby demonstrating her opinion about his murder to his murderer and successor, her own son Lucien. Although her devotion to her son Jean was well-understood, particularly when she insisted on being buried beside him, she was also devoted to Lucien, whose claim of self-defense she believed.

Claudine died in 1515 during Lucien's reign.  In her will, she stated that her rights to the three provinces of the Lordship of Monaco was to be passed on to her children in accordance with the succession order stated in the will of her father and grandfather, securing female succession on condition that it did not result to a change in dynasty: she also reinstated her granddaughter Marie Grimaldi (daughter of Jean II) in the succession, despite Lucien having forced her to renounce her claims upon her marriage.  As Claudine was not regarded as a ruler since 1458, the fact that she could make a will of her rights to the throne, regulating succession, is curious fact in regards to her legal position.

Issue 
Claudine had at least six children, or as much as 14:

Jean II (1468 – 11 October 1505)
Louis (deemed insane and barred from the inheritance)
Blanche Grimaldi, married in 1501 to Honoré (baron de Tourette) de Villeneuve d'Espinouse, co-regent for Lucien's son Honoré I, Lord of Monaco with Nicolas Grimaldi in 1532.  
Augustino, Bishop of Grasse (1482 – 14 April 1532)
Francesca (d. before 1523); married Luc Doria. Her son Bartholomew Doria murdered her brother Lucien.
Lucien (1487 – 22 August 1523)

References

Further reading 
 Michel-Yves Mourou, Princesses de Monaco, Editions du Rocher, Monaco, 2010. 

1450s births
1515 deaths
15th-century Lords of Monaco
15th-century French women
16th-century French women
15th-century French people
16th-century French people
15th-century women rulers
Lords of Monaco
House of Grimaldi
People of Ligurian descent
Medieval child monarchs